Many species of wildflowers are native to New England. There are four important community types which show considerable diversity and blending across this United States physiographic region. These are: alpine, coniferous forests, northern hardwood forests, and wetlands. Wetlands may be further subdivided into bogs, swamps, and bottomlands.  
This article lists some of these Wildflowers of New England and references sites for further research.

Threats
Habitat Loss and Invasive Species are major threats to the wildflowers of this region.
These invasive species include Purple Loosestrife, Garlic Mustard and Multiflora Rose.

Image gallery

See also
 New England-Acadian forests
 Wildflowers of the Great Smoky Mountains
 Wildflowers of the Canadian Rocky Mountains
 List of San Francisco Bay Area wildflowers
 Lady Bird Johnson Wildflower Center
 Brandywine Wildflower and Native Plant Gardens
 Wildflower Festival

Resources
Spring Wildflowers of New England by Marilyn Dwelley (Hardcover), Down East Books; 2nd edition (July 2000),.
Summer & Fall Wildflowers of New England by Marilyn Dwelley (Hardcover), Down East Books; 2nd revised edition (November 2004),.

External links
New England Wildflower Society
Taxonomy of New England Plants
 Guide to Fall Wildflowers of New England

New England
Wildflowers
Lists of flora of the United States